Naima Wifstrand (4 September 1890 – 23 October 1968) was a Swedish film actress, operetta singer, troubadour, director and composer. In her later years, she was cast in several supporting roles in Ingmar Bergman films.

Biography
Born Siri Naima Matilda Wifstrand in Stockholm in 1890, she was raised by her mother in Fleminggatan. Wifstrand never trained acting but learned the art thoroughly when she in 1905 joined the Anna Lundberg Theatre Company, a well reputed and respected theatre company in Sweden at the time. She travelled with them for a number of years, appearing in small parts and in extra parts. This eventually led her to small parts at theatres in Helsinki and around Stockholm. But at this time Wifstrand did not have her mind set on acting, instead she sought to be a singer. And it was as a grand operetta singer she became famous and enjoyed a much successful star career for 30 years in Sweden (her speaking parts as an actress came long after; when she after singing-career gradually turned to acting in the 1940s and then earned acclaim as one of Sweden's finest supporting and character actresses on stage and film).

Career and break-through
Wifstrand studied music and singing in Stockholm at the Swedish Royal Academy of Music and in 1910 she went to London and further trained for Raymond von zur Mühlen. After her studies she was one of the most acknowledged operetta singers in Scandinavia. She worked at Oscarsteatern (Sweden's foremost operetta and musical stage) 1913–1918 and for years to come toured Sweden and Scandinavia. Her big break-through came as Countess Stasi in Emmerich Kálmán's operetta Die Csárdásfürstin in 1916. She worked in the 1920s mainly at the opera houses in Oslo and Copenhagen. For many years she lived in London where she also performed with troubadour-songs alone along with her guitar. A curiosity here is that when the first attempts at broadcast television took place in Britain Wifstrand became one of the first "TV-stars", so to speak, as she appeared on TV in the 1930s and performed a number of songs.

In 1937 Swedish stage director Per Lindberg cast her as Mother Peachum in Bertolt Brecht's The Threepenny Opera (in Swe: Tolvskillingsoperan) which became a hugely successful production and toured with Riksteatern. When Bertolt Brecht later left Germany because of the Nazis he first moved to Sweden where he lived for a time and wrote the part Mother Courage especially for Wifstrand – but sadly, she herself never got to play the part in what became one of Brecht's most successful plays. During his stay in Sweden, Wifstrand had helped Brecht both financially and also personally with accommodation.

Filming and Bergman

Naima Wifstrand in the 1940s planned to retire from her own stage career by turning to directing, first at the Royal Swedish Opera 1944–1946. However, due to some successful supporting parts in some Swedish 1940s films – where Naima surprised critics and proved herself a surprisingly strong and charismatic character actress – a number of Sweden's young stage and film directors approached her and offered her parts in dramatic productions on stage: one of these young directors was Ingmar Bergman. Later on Wifstrand became one of the director's most reliable and longtime ensemble actors. She was part of Bergman's ensemble (1954–1961) during all his legendary years at Malmö City Theatre. Later he would also cast her in some of his most memorable early films, including Wild Strawberries, Smiles of a Summer Night and The Magician. Aside from this she also worked with the new established Stockholm City Theatre 1962–1963 and at Gothenburg City Theatre from 1964.

Naima Wifstrand was married to captain Erling Nielsen from 1921 to 1928.

Selected filmography

 Madame besøker Oslo (1927) - Madam Vera
 Pjerrot (1931)
 Pierrot græder (1931)
 Kungsgatan (1943) - Caretaker's Wife
 En dotter född (1944) - Edit
 Se opp för spioner! (1944) - Madame Carin
 Sten Stensson kommer till stan (1945) - Emma Bohrn
 Flickor i hamn (1945) - Mrs. Holst
 Stiliga Augusta (1946) - Fru Lundahl
 Evening at the Djurgarden (1946) - Mrs. Bender
 Jag älskar dig, argbigga (1946) - Anna
 Hotell Kåkbrinken (1946) - Mia
 How to Love (1947) - Vera Stätt
 Life in the Finnish Woods (1947) - Mrs. Sigrid Malm
 Two Women (1947) - Mrs. Jonsson
 Två kvinnor (1947) - Mrs. Jonsson
 The Night Watchman's Wife (1947) - Mrs. Eklund
 Det kom en gäst... (1947) - Grevinna Doris af Ernstam
 The People of Simlang Valley (1947) - Skoga-Börta
 The Poetry of Ådalen (1947) - Kersti
 Den långa vägen (1947) - Hedvig Charlotta Nordenflycht
 Music in Darkness (1948) - Mrs. Schröder
 Lappblod (1948) - Mina
 Hammarforsens brus (1948) - Marit's Grandma
 Sunshine (1948) - Helena
 Private Bom (1948) - Översköterskan
 Kvinnan gör mig galen (1948) - Hulda
 Flottans kavaljerer (1948) - Mateos mor
 The Devil and the Smalander (1949) - Titta Grå
 Playing Truant (1949) - Dehlin
 Thirst (1949) - Naima Wifstrand
 Singoalla (1949) - Cioara
 Fästmö uthyres (1950) - Old Lady
 Södrans revy (1950)
 My Name Is Puck (1951) - Agneta Lindman
 Valley of Eagles (1951) - Baroness Erland
 Say It with Flowers (1952) - Mrs. Lagerberg
 The Clang of the Pick (1952) - Narrator / Clothes Saleswoman
 Secrets of Women (1952) - Mrs. Lobelius (uncredited)
 For the Sake of My Intemperate Youth (1952) - Vendela Påhlman
 Ursula, the Girl from the Finnish Forests (1953) - Mossi
 The Road to Klockrike (1953) - Waterhead's Mother
 The Beat of Wings in the Night (1953) - Ane
 Malin går hem (1953)
 The Magnificent Lie (1955) - Gertrud (50 years later)
 The Dance Hall (1955) - 'Madame'
 Dreams (1955) - Mrs. Arén (uncredited)
 Paradise (1955) - Mrs. Ekström
 Smiles of a Summer Night (1955) - Mrs. Armfeldt
 La Sorcière (1956) - Maila
 The Girl in Tails (1956) - Widow Hyltenius
 My Passionate Longing (1956) - Lisa
 Mr. Sleeman Is Coming (1957, TV Movie) - Tant Bina
 Seventeen Years Old (1957) - Clara
 Wild Strawberries (1957) - Mrs. Borg - Isak's Mother
 The Magician (1958) - Granny Vogler
 The Judge (1960) - Mrs. Wangendorff
 Briggen Tre Liljor (1961) - Farmor Tuvesson
 Nils Holgerssons underbara resa (1962) - Mother Akka (voice)
 Myten (1966) - Mrs. von Grün
 Night Games (1966) - Astrid
 Hour of the Wolf (1968) - Old Lady with Hat
 Vindingevals (1968) - The Old Lady

External links
 

1890 births
1968 deaths
Singers from Stockholm
Swedish film actresses
Swedish women composers
20th-century Swedish actresses
20th-century Swedish women singers
20th-century women composers